Alisa Khachatryan is an Armenian professional footballer. She currently plays for Armenia.

See also
List of Armenia women's international footballers

External links
 

Living people
Armenian women's footballers
Armenia women's international footballers
Year of birth missing (living people)
Women's association football defenders